Wolmer's Schools in Kingston, Jamaica, consists of Wolmer's Pre-School, Wolmer's Preparatory School and two high schools: Wolmer's Trust High School For Girls and Wolmer's Trust High School for Boys. While acknowledged as separate institutions, each school carries the same crest, motto, "Age Quod Agis", a Latin phrase that translates as "Whatever you do, do it well". They also use the same school song. Wolmer's Schools closely resemble British schools of the 1950s more than those today, a trend that can be noted of the entire Jamaican schooling system. Wolmer's Boys' and Girls' have been deemed some of the top schools in the Caribbean and from most sources it has been recognized as apart of the top ten schools in Jamaica and in the region. Wolmer's Girls' was ranked second, after Glenmuir High School, in the Reform of Education in Jamaica 2021 for top value-added traditional/secondary school in the island, with St. Jago High School ranking fifth.

History
Wolmer's is the second oldest high school in the Caribbean, having been established in 1729 by John Wolmer, a goldsmith, who bequeathed £2,360 for the establishment of a Free School. However, it did not come into existence until 1736, when the Wolmer's Trust was set up.

The oldest is Combermere School, in Barbados, originally the Drax Parish School, established in 1695 by the will of Colonel Henry Drax, a son of Sir James Drax, of 1682. The third (by record thus far) being Harrison College in Barbados, formerly Harrison Free School, established in 1733.

Wolmer's is certainly the oldest school in the Caribbean to retain its original name. It turned into a group of schools, which was completely overhauled during the educational reforms of Governor John Peter Grant, who brought two new schoolmasters over from England.

Wolmer's is the oldest continually operating school in Jamaica.

Curriculum
At the secondary-school level, Wolmer's Schools follow the traditional English grammar-school model used throughout the British West Indies, which incorporates the optional year 12 and 13, collectively known as Sixth Form. The first year of secondary school is regarded as first form, or year seven, and the subsequent year groups are numbered in increasing order up to sixth form. The school offers a wide range of CSEC and CAPE subjects done at the fifth- and sixth-form levels respectively. It has been known for being the only all-boys school in Jamaica to be ranked in the top ten high schools on the island; the girls' school is also ranked in the top ten high schools on the island. The high schools have been known to perform well in the sciences.

School crest
The Wolmer's Schools crest is a replica of the original School Seal from the 1700s and represents "The Sun of Learning bursting through the Cloud of Ignorance".

Rhodes Scholars
Since 1904, Wolmer's Schools has educated 24 Rhodes Scholars.

Cricket
Wolmer's Boys School has the most wins of the Sunlight Cup for Inter-Scholastic Under 19 Cricket. Moreover, the school continues to produce cricketers that have represented Jamaica and the West Indies Cricket Team.  The school is noted in cricket in the West Indies for having produced six test wicket-keepers. The Daily Telegraph once wrote: "One school: six Test wicket-keepers. There has never been any nurturing like it."

Notable alumni  

Arts, culture and entertainment
 Cherine Anderson, international recording artiste, actress, President of The Reach One Child R.O.C. Foundation
 Peter Ashbourne CD, composer
 James Aubrey (actor)-Austrian born English actor
 Harry Belafonte OJ, actor and singer, winner of Tony, Emmy, Grammy and Oscar Awards
 Aston Cooke, playwright
 David Heron, playwright and actor
 Marlon James, novelist
 Diana King, international recording artiste
 Sean Paul, Grammy-winning artiste
 Kei Miller, novelist and poet
 Wayne Marshall, artiste
 Henry Wilcoxon, actor
 Paul Williamson, tenor

Business, finance and politics
Lloyd Carney, American businessman
Amy Jacques Garvey, wife of Marcus Mosiah Garvey
Florizel Glasspole, Governor General of Jamaica 1973–1991
Douglas Orane, Former CEO of GraceKennedy
Juliet Holness, Member of Parliament in Jamaica
Keble Munn, former Minister of Agriculture and Minister of National Security
Patsy Robertson, diplomat, Official Spokesperson for The Commonwealth 1983–1994
Edward Seaga, Prime Minister of Jamaica 1980–1989
Brian Wynter, Governor of the Bank of Jamaica
Harold Moody, doctor and campaigner for racial equality in Britain

Sports
 Gerry Alexander, cricketer
 Ivan Barrow, cricketer
 Carlton Baugh, cricketer 
 Gareth Breese, cricketer
 Patrick Harris, cricketer
 Roy Anthony Bridge, sports administrator and IOC member
 Christoff Bryan, national high-jump record holder
 Jeff Dujon, cricketer
 Ashani Fairclough, footballer
 Julian Forte, track athlete
 Shelly-Ann Fraser-Pryce, track athlete – double Olympic Gold medallist in the 100m
 Lindel Frater, track athlete
 Michael Frater, track athlete – Olympic Gold Medallist in the 4 x 100m
 Ricardo Gardner, footballer – English Premier League (Bolton Wanderers)
 Jackie Hendriks, cricketer
 Omar Holness – footballer
 Jaheel Hyde, Olympian
 Peter Isaacs, footballer
 Sir Herbert Macdonald, footballer, tennis player and sports administrator and promoter
 Germaine Mason, Olympian
 Karl Nunes, cricketer
 Patrick Patterson, cricketer
 Allan Rae, cricketer
 Luton Shelton, footballer – record holder for most goals for Jamaica in international football
 Khari Stephenson, footballer
 Paul Young, footballer

References

External links
 Official site

Schools in Jamaica
Organizations established in 1729
Educational institutions established in 1729
Schools in Kingston, Jamaica
1729 establishments in Jamaica